Anolis anfiloquioi, the brown-eyed bush anole or Anfiodlul anole, is a species of lizard in the family Dactyloidae. The species is found in Cuba.

References

Anoles
Reptiles of Cuba
Endemic fauna of Cuba
Reptiles described in 1980
Taxa named by Orlando H. Garrido